Milan Todorović (born 28 February 1983) is a Serbian football midfielder.

References

External links
 

1983 births
Living people
Sportspeople from Niš
Association football midfielders
Serbian footballers
FK Vlasina players
FK Radnički Niš players
FK Radnički Pirot players
FK Sinđelić Niš players
Serbian expatriate footballers
Serbian expatriate sportspeople in Albania
Expatriate footballers in Albania